John Tuchet, 4th Baron Audley, 1st Baron Tuchet (23 April 1371 – 19 December 1408) was an English peer.

John Tuchet, 4th Baron Audley was the son of Sir John Tuchet, called "Baron Audley", and his wife Maud, widow of Sir Richard de Willoughby. His paternal grandparents were Sir John Tuchet (1327—1371) and his wife Joan Audley (1331–1393, daughter of James Audley, 2nd Baron Audley and first wife Lady Joan Mortimer).

In 1391, when his childless great-uncle Nicholas Audley, 3rd Baron Audley died, the Audley Barony was abeyant. Meanwhile, he was created 1st Baron Tuchet in 1403 and received one-third of the share of the barony of Audley.

In 1408 the Barony was revived, and John Tuchet became 4th Baron Audley.

Before 1398, he married Elizabeth Stafford, daughter of Sir Humphrey Stafford and his first wife, Alice Grenville. They had one son, James, and two daughters, Margaret and Elizabeth. John was succeeded by his only son, James Tuchet.

References

1371 births
1408 deaths
04
Place of birth missing